British Mandate of Palestine or Palestine Mandate most often refers to:

 Mandate for Palestine: a League of Nations mandate under which the British controlled an area which included Mandatory Palestine and the Emirate of Transjordan.
 Mandatory Palestine: the territory and its history between 1920 and 1948